Henderson Creek may refer to:

Henderson Creek (Illinois)
Henderson Creek (Neals Creek), a stream in Missouri, USA
Te Wai-o-Pareira / Henderson Creek, a creek in the suburb of Henderson, in Auckland, New Zealand